John Paxton (1911–1985) was an American screenwriter.

John Paxton may also refer to:

 John Paxton (cricketer) (1819–1868), English cricketer
 J. F. Paxton (1857–1936), Canadian ice hockey administrator
 John Paxton (footballer) (born 1890), English footballer
 John L. Paxton (1920–2011), father of Bill Paxton and occasional actor
 John Paxton (ichthyologist) (born 1938), United States-born Australian ichthyologist at the Australian Museum, Sydney
 John M. Paxton Jr. (born 1951), American Marine Corps general